Iovine is a surname. Notable people with the surname include:

Alessio Iovine (born 1991), Italian footballer 
Antonio Iovine (born 1964), Italian Camorrista
Jimmy Iovine (born 1953), American record producer
Julie V. Iovine, American writer
Vicki Iovine (born 1954), American model and writer